Ram Swaroop is  an Indian athlete. He won a silver medal in the   relay in the 1951 Delhi Asian games.

References

Indian male sprinters
Asian Games medalists in athletics (track and field)
Athletes (track and field) at the 1951 Asian Games
Asian Games silver medalists for India
Medalists at the 1951 Asian Games
Possibly living people
Year of birth missing